The 1821 Land Lottery was the fourth lottery of the Georgia Land Lotteries, a lottery system used by the U.S. state of Georgia between the years 1805 and 1833 to steal Cherokee and Muscogee land and redistribute it to white settlers. The 1821 lottery was authorized by the Georgia General Assembly by an act of May 16, 1821. The lottery redistributed land in Dooly, Fayette, Henry, Houston, and Monroe counties. The 1821 lottery was used to confiscate Muscogee land and redistribute it to white settlers.

The stolen lots were 202.5 acres in size. Registration for the lottery occurred in the two months after the Act's publication on May 16 1821, with drawings occurring between November 7 and December 12, 1821. Fortunate drawers from the previous Georgia land lotteries were excluded, as well as draft resisters who refused to fight in the War of 1812 or the Indian Wars, criminals, tax defaulters, and absconders for debt.

List of fortunate drawers

See also
Georgia Land Lotteries
1805 Land Lottery
1807 Land Lottery
1820 Land Lottery
1827 Land Lottery
1832 Land Lottery
Gold Lottery of 1832
1833 Fractions Lottery
Georgia resolutions 1827
Indian removal

References

Further reading
Lucas, Silas Emmett. The Fourth or 1821 Land Lottery of Georgia. Easley, S.C.: Southern Historical Press, 1986.

External links
Georgia Land Lottery Records Research Guide, Random Acts of Genealogical Kindness

1821 in Georgia (U.S. state)
Georgia Land Lotteries
Government of Georgia (U.S. state)
History of Georgia (U.S. state)
Muscogee
Lotteries in the United States